The Party of Action for Change in Togo (Parti d’Action pour le Changement au Togo) is a political party in Togo.

References

Political parties in Togo